Jason Mott is an American novelist and poet. His 2021 novel Hell of a Book won the National Book Award for Fiction.

Early life and education
Mott was born in Bolton, North Carolina. He attended Cape Fear Community College and graduated from the University of North Carolina Wilmington with a Bachelor of Fine Arts in Fiction and a Master of Fine Arts in Poetry.

Career
Mott's debut novel, The Returned, was published in 2013. It centered on the return of dead people to the living world and their impact on the daily lives of the people around them. The novel was adapted into the television series Resurrection, which was produced by ABC Studios and aired in 2014 and 2015.

Mott's fourth novel, Hell of a Book, was published by Dutton on June 29, 2021. On November 17, 2021, the novel was awarded the 2021 National Book Award for Fiction. It was nominated for the 2021 Sir Walter Raleigh Prize for Fiction. It was also longlisted for the 2022 Andrew Carnegie Medal for Excellence in Fiction, the 2022 Aspen Words Literary Prize, and the 2022 Joyce Carol Oates Prize.

Works

Novels

Poetry collections

References

External links

Living people
21st-century American male writers
21st-century American novelists
21st-century African-American writers
African-American novelists
American male novelists
National Book Award winners
Novelists from North Carolina
People from Columbus County, North Carolina
University of North Carolina at Wilmington alumni
Year of birth missing (living people)
African-American male writers